Brdo is a settlement in the Municipality of Šentjur, in eastern Slovenia. It lies in the Sava Hills north of Planina pri Sevnici. The settlement, and the entire municipality, are included in the Savinja Statistical Region, which is in the Slovenian portion of the historical Duchy of Styria.

References

External links
Brdo at Geopedia

Populated places in the Municipality of Šentjur